Justice Carmelino Gomez Alvendia Sr. (November 3, 1906 - March 6, 1982) was a justice of Court of Appeals of the Philippines, a founder of Quezon City Academy and a co-founder of the Manuel L. Quezon University (MLQU), formerly Manuel L. Quezon Educational Institute, in 1947.

Biography
Alvendia was born on November 3, 1906, at Floridablanca, Pampanga. He earned his Associate of Arts in the University of the Philippines in 1926. He received his Bachelor of Laws degree, cum laude, in 1930 and his Master of Laws degree in 1933 from the university. While in the university, he joined the Upsilon Sigma Phi in 1926.

In 1938, he earned his Doctor of Civil Law in the University of Santo Tomas. During the tenure of President Diosdado Macapagal of the Philippines, he was elevated as one of the justices of Court of Appeals.

In 1963, he bought Bago Bantay Academy located in the heart of Epifanio de los Santos Avenue (EDSA) and renamed it "Quezon City Academy" (QCA). QCA remains a secondary school in Metro Manila.

Alvendia died on March 6, 1982. During the centenary of his birth, QCA conducted a program and celebrations that were attended by thousands of alumni from 1953 to 2008.

Heritage Bahay na Puti (Alvendia House)
The Floridablanca, Pampanga Justice Carmelino Alvendia Sr. ancestral mansion ("White House")  is owned, preserved and maintained by his family.

See also
 Quezon City Academy
 Manuel L. Quezon University
 Philippine Court of Appeals

References

External links
Official website of Manuel L. Quezon University
Official website of Quezon City Academy

Filipino educators
Filipino judges
1906 births
1982 deaths
University of the Philippines alumni
University of Santo Tomas alumni
Manuel L. Quezon University
20th-century Filipino lawyers
People from Pampanga
Burials at La Loma Cemetery
Justices of the Court of Appeals of the Philippines